Sir John Knyvet (or Knivett) (died 16 February 1381) was an English lawyer and administrator. He was Chief Justice of the King's Bench from 1365 to 1372, and Lord Chancellor of England from 1372 to 1377.

Life
Knyvett was eldest son of Richard Knyvet of Southwick, Northamptonshire, and a keeper of the "Forest of Clyve" (now part of Rockingham Forest). His mother was Joanna, a daughter and the heiress of Sir John Wurth. He married Eleanor, daughter of Ralph, Lord Basset of Weldon, and they had four sons and a daughter. He owned and improved Southwick Manor, which he inherited from his father; the house still survives today.

Knyvet was practicing in the courts as early as 1347; in 1357 he was called to the degree of Serjeant-at-law, and on 30 September 1361 was appointed a justice of the Court of Common Pleas. On 29 October 1365 he was raised to the office of Chief Justice of the King's bench. In the Parliament of 1362 he served as a "trier of petitions" for Aquitaine and other lands over sea, and afterwards in each Parliament down to 1380, except while he was Chancellor, as a trier of petitions for England, Scotland, Wales, and Ireland.

On 30 June 1372, after the death of Sir Robert Thorpe, who had been appointed Chancellor in consequence of a petition by the commons that the great seal should be entrusted to laymen, Knyvet was appointed his successor. He held the office for four and a half years until 1377; three speeches which he made at the opening of Parliament in 1372, 1373, and 1376 respectively, are given in the Rolls of Parliament.

In January 1377 Edward III, under the influence of John of Gaunt, reverted to the custom of appointing ecclesiastical chancellors, and Adam de Houghton was appointed to succeed Knyvet on 11 January Knyvet did not again hold judicial office, though he was appointed with the two chief justices to decide a question between the Earl of Pembroke and William la Zouch of Haryngworth. He was an executor of the will of Edward III.

Family
Knyvet held large estates both in Northamptonshire and East Anglia, and when he died in 1381 his descendants established themselves as an important family in Norfolk. His children included:
 Henry Knyvet
 John Knyvet (c. 1359–1418). He became M.P. for Huntingdonshire, and married Joan Botetort.
 Richard Knyvet
 Robert Knyvet (d.1419), second son, married Margaret and had Thomas Knyvet (d.1458) of Stanway, Essex, Esq., son and heir, who married Eleanor, daughter of John Doreward of Doreward's Hall, and had a son called John Knyvet
 Margery Knyvet

A member of the family, Katherine Knyvet, was elected as the Abbess of Delapré Abbey in Northampton in 1333. She died of the plague there in 1349.

See also
 List of Lord Chancellors and Lord Keepers

References

External links
Southwick Hall website

Lord chancellors of England
Lord chief justices of England and Wales
14th-century English judges
1381 deaths
Year of birth unknown
Justices of the Common Pleas
John
Serjeants-at-law (England)